Biharwe  Football Club  was a Ugandan football club located in Biharwe, Mbarara in Western Uganda.  The club played in the Ugandan Super League in the 2007–08 season but there is currently no FUFA records that the club is still operating.

History
In the 2006 season, Biharwe FC reached the semi-finals of the Western Region Mini League before going down to Masindi Town Council FC. In the 2006–07 season Biharwe were more successful and progressed to the finals of the Western Region Mini League (in Bushenyi) by defeating Kilembe Mines FC 4–0 in the semi-finals.  In the zone final they beat Toro United 2–1 to gain promotion to the Uganda Super League.

Like most teams making their debut into the Super League, Biharwe found the gulf in standards too great and failed to survive the relegation battle, finally finishing in 18th position at the bottom of the division.

Record in the top tier

References

External links
 Uganda – List of Champions – RSSSF (Hans Schöggl)

Mbarara
Football clubs in Uganda